American football
 Oilers, 1960–97 (AFL/NFL) – Now the Tennessee Titans, the team relocated to Memphis and later to Nashville, Tennessee.
 Texans, 1974–75 (WFL) – The team relocated to Shreveport, Louisiana.
 Herricanes, 1976–79 (NWFL)
 Gamblers, 1984–85 (USFL) 
 Terror/Thunderbears, 1996–2001 (AFL)
 Outlaws, 1999 (RFL)
 Marshals, 2000 (SFL)
 Copperheads, 2006–2008 (NIFL/AF2)
 Wild Riders, 2007 (NIFL)
 Ruff Riders, 2007–08 (Intense Football League) – The team relocated to Abilene.
 Texas Cyclones, 2008–10 (NWFA/WFA/IWFL)
 Lightning 2009–2010 (SIFL)
 Stallions, 2010–2012 (SIFL/LSFL)
 Lady Oilers, 2011–2013 (WAFL)
 Wildcats, 2016–2017 (USWFL)
 Baseball
 Buffaloes (Buffs), 1888–1961 (Texas League, American Association), reorganized and relocated to Oklahoma City after their buyout by the Houston Astros.  The team still exists as the Oklahoma City RedHawks. 
 Eagles, 1949-c.1950s (Negro league baseball team, remnants of legendary Newark Eagles)
 Apollos, 2002–2021 (Big States League/Pecos League/AAIPB)
 Toros, 2007–2009 (CBL)
 Strykers, 2012—2016 (TCL)
 Basketball
 Ada Oilers, 1952–57 (Amateur Athletic Association/NIBL)
 Mavericks, 1967–69 (ABA)
 Angels, 1978–1980 (Women's Professional Basketball League)
 Shamrocks, 1984 (WABA)
 Comets, 1997–2008  (WNBA)
 Flames, 2000 (WSBL)
 Stealth, 2002–2004 (NWBA)
 Undertakers/Takers/Red Storm, 2006–2012 (ABA)
 Asteroids, 2010 (GPBL 2)
 Legends, 2012-2015 (ABA)
 Assault, 2013–2015 (ABA)
 Inferno, 2013–2015 (BBA)
 Bandits, 2015 (ABA)
 Wolverines, 2017 (NABL)
 Galaxy, 2017–20 (WMLBA)
 Toros, 2018 (NABL)
 Ballers, 2018–19 (JBA)
 Push, 2021 (TBL)
 Imperials, 2022 (TBL)
 Hockey
 Skippers, 1946–47 (USHL)
 Huskies, 1947–48 (USHL)
 Apollos, 1965–69; 1979–81 (CHL)
 Aeros, 1972–78 (WHA)
 Aeros, 1994–2013 (IHL/AHL) – Now the Iowa Wild, the team relocated to Des Moines, Iowa.
 Blast, 2001–02 (Gulf Coast Hockey League)
 Imperials, 2013–2016 (NA3HL)
 Soccer
 Stars, 1967–68 (USA)
 Hurricane, 1978–80 (NASL)
 Summit, 1978–80 (MISL)
 Dynamos, 1983–91 (USL/LSSA)
 Express, 1988–90 (SISL)
 Alianza, 1988–91 (LSSA)
 Hotshots, 1994–97 (CISL)
 Force, 1995 (USL-2)
 Hurricanes, 1996–2000 (USL-2)
 Hotshots, 1999–2000 (WISL)
 Tornados, 1999–2001 (W-League)
 Toros, 2002–2003 (PDL)
 Stars, 2003-2005 (WPSL)
 Tornadoes, 2003 (WPSL)
 Leones, 2007–2010 (PDL)
 South Select, 2007–2016 (WPSL)
 Dutch Lions, 2011–2019 (NPSL)
 Hurricanes FC, 2012–2013 (NPSL)
 Regals SCA, 2013; 2015–2018 (NPSL)
 Team tennis
 E-Z Riders, 1974 (World Team Tennis)
 Astro-Knots, 1982–1983 (TeamTennis)
 Wranglers, 2005–2007 (World TeamTennis)
 Cricket
 Arrow Heads, 2004 (Pro Cricket)
 Softball
 Thunder, 2004–2006 (National Pro Fastpitch)
 Scrap Yard Dawgs, 2016–2017 (National Pro Fastpitch)

References

External links 
 Remember the Houston Mavericks
 Houston Gamblers Memorabilia Page
The History of Soccer in Houston

Sports in Houston
Houston